"She’s Just My Style" is a song written by Al Capps, Thomas Lesslie "Snuff" Garrett, Gary Lewis, and Leon Russell and was recorded by Gary Lewis & the Playboys. The song reached #3 on the Billboard Hot 100 in January 1966.

Background
Gary Lewis confirms that "She's Just My Style" is the song of his that gets the most airplay today on radio. He told interviewer Ray Shasho in 2013 that he sought to emulate the style of The Beach Boys with the recording. "That's exactly what we were going for too. Even before we started writing it we said 'Let's go for The Beach Boys thing; a little rock and roll with a lot of harmony and I was really happy the way we pulled it off."

The recording also has the distinction of being the very first session that legendary studio drummer Jim Keltner played on, shortly after his arrival in Hollywood from Oklahoma, as Keltner himself related in an interview available on YouTube.

Cover versions
The Astronauts
Cub Koda
Leon Russell
The Ventures on their 1966 album, Where the Action Is!

References

1966 singles
1966 songs
Songs written by Leon Russell
Gary Lewis & the Playboys songs
Liberty Records singles